SBAI may refer to:

 Softball Association of India, the governing body for softball in India
 Standards Board for Alternative Investments, an international standard-setting body for the alternative investment industry

See also
Sbai, a garment worn in mainland south east Asia
Sbai (surname) including Sbaï